Dr Nagalingam Ethirveerasingam is a former Sri Lankan athlete who represented Sri Lanka (then Ceylon) at the 1952 (Helsinki) and 1956 (Melbourne) Summer Olympic Games.

Ethirveerasingam also participated in three Asian Games: 1954 (Manila), 1958 (Tokyo), and 1962 (Djakarta).

He won THE Gold Medal at the 1958 Tokyo Asian Games, which was the first Gold Medal of any kind for Sri Lanka (Ceylon).

At the 1962 Djakarta Asian Games he took home the Silver Medal. He was co-record holder at the 1954 Manila Asian Games after jumping the same height (1.95 meters) as the gold, silver, and bronze jumpers, but came fourth due to having more misses than the other athletes. Ethirveerasingam finished eleventh in the 1958 British Empire and Commonwealth Games high jump.

Early life and career
He was a student at Jaffna Central College, where apart from his accomplishments in athletics, he was also a cricketer, which is not well-publicised because of his athletic achievements. He competed for UCLA in the high jump at the 1959 and 1960 conference championships.

He taught at universities in Sierra Leone, Papua New Guinea, Nigeria and Sri Lanka. He also worked for UNESCO for five years.

In later years whilst lecturing in Sierra Leone he captained the University cricket team in the local cricket tournament and in 1973 was appointed vice captain of the national team that played against the neighbouring country of Gambia. Ethirveerasingam received a PhD and wrote several books, one being "The Effect of Advance Presentation of Organizers On Complex Verbal Learning and Retention by Vocational Agriculture Students in New York State."

See also
 Duncan White
 Susanthika Jayasinghe

References

External links
 
 sports-reference.com
 
 
 
 
 

American people of Sri Lankan Tamil descent
Sri Lankan Tamil sportspeople
Sri Lankan male high jumpers
Olympic athletes of Sri Lanka
Athletes (track and field) at the 1952 Summer Olympics
Athletes (track and field) at the 1956 Summer Olympics
Living people
Sri Lankan Hindus
American Hindus
Asian Games medalists in athletics (track and field)
Medalists at the 1958 Asian Games
Medalists at the 1962 Asian Games
Asian Games gold medalists for Sri Lanka
Asian Games silver medalists for Sri Lanka
Athletes (track and field) at the 1958 Asian Games
Athletes (track and field) at the 1962 Asian Games
Commonwealth Games competitors for Sri Lanka
Athletes (track and field) at the 1958 British Empire and Commonwealth Games
Sri Lankan emigrants to the United States
Alumni of Jaffna Central College
1934 births